Sheffield City Council elections usually take place by thirds, three years out of every four. Sheffield City Council is the local authority for the metropolitan borough of Sheffield in South Yorkshire, England. Each of Sheffield's 28 wards is represented by three positions on the council, meaning there are usually 28 seats contested in each local election. 1967, 1973, 2004 and 2016 saw new ward boundaries and therefore all seats were contested.

Political control

From 1889 to 1974 Sheffield was a county borough, independent of any county council. Under the Local Government Act 1972 it had its territory enlarged and became a metropolitan borough, with South Yorkshire County Council providing county-level services. The first election to the reconstituted city council was held in 1973, initially operating as a shadow authority before coming into its revised powers on 1 April 1974. South Yorkshire County Council was abolished in 1986 and Sheffield became a unitary authority. Political control of the council since 1973 has been held by the following parties:

Leadership
The leaders of the council since 1901 have been:

County Borough

The last leader of the city council before the 1974 reforms, Ron Ironmonger, went on to be the first leader of South Yorkshire County Council.

Metropolitan Borough

Council elections
Before 1974, elections were by thirds annually for a three-year term, with Aldermen elected from the body of councillors every three years. In 1974, Aldermen were abolished, and elections to Sheffield City Council are by thirds, in three years of every four, for a four-year term.

For twenty years from 1846, Isaac Ironside's Central Democratic Association was a force on the council.  It then returned to typical Conservative–Liberal rivalry.  Labour made little impact in its early years; by 1918, there were only three Labour councillors (and two Liberal-Labour, plus one Lib-Lab alderman).  That all changed in 1919; Labour won almost all the seats up for election that year, giving them 12 and their coalition partners the Co-operative Party two.  In response to their losses, the Conservative and Liberal groups merged to form the Citizens Association, retaining control with 32 councillors and 15 aldermen.  The Lib-Labs remained unchanged in numbers and politically between the two groups.

Labour continued to advance at the expense of the Citizens Association.  By 1922, there were 18 Labour councillors and one alderman; by 1925, 22 councillors and one alderman.  At the 1926 elections, Labour rose to 29 councillors.  A majority on the council and a large number of retiring aldermen finally enabled them to take 8 positions on the aldermanic bench.

The seats were redistributed into 24 wards in 1930, and the Citizens Association renamed itself the Progressive Party, and a further seat was added for Norton in 1934, taking the total number of positions to 75 councillors and 25 aldermen.  That year, Labour briefly lost control, but regained it in 1934, with an increased majority of 12.  This rose to 14 the following year.  In 1945, Labour had 59 total seats to the Progressive's 39, one independent and one Communist.  Labour continued to build its majority, to 34 in 1952 and 42 by 1958.  However, it lost control to the Conservative Party, again standing on its own, in 1968-9.

Boundary changes took place for the 2004 election which reduced the number of seats by 3, leading to the whole council being elected in that year.

Borough result maps

By-election results
By-elections occur when seats become vacant between council elections. Below is a summary of recent by-elections; full by-election results can be found by clicking on the by-election name.

See also
Sheffield City Council

References

External links
Sheffield City Council
Members of Sheffield City Council 1974–present

 
Politics of Sheffield
Council elections in South Yorkshire
Local government in Sheffield
Sheffield